Cronicl y Cerddor was a 19th-century monthly Welsh language music magazine, first published in Treherbert, Wales, by l. Jones in 1880.

The magazine's founder, musician and composer David Emlyn Evans (1843 - 1913) edited the magazine, which contained mainly articles about music and musicians, and compositions (published as supplement). Schoolmaster, musician, and writer, Moses Owen Jones (1842 - 1908) assisted as the magazine's deputy editor.

References 

Periodicals published in Wales
Welsh-language magazines
Music magazines published in the United Kingdom